Tyrifjorden (Lake Tyri) is a lake in Norway. It has a volume of 13 km3, is 295 meters deep at its deepest, and lies 63 meters above sea level. The lake's primary source is the Begna river, which discharges into Tyrifjorden at Hønefoss where the river forms the waterfall of Hønefossen. Its primary outlet is at Vikersund near the lake's southwest corner, where Tyrifjorden discharges into the Drammenselva river.

Location

Tyrifjorden is located in the county of Viken and borders the municipalities of Hole, Lier, Modum, and Ringerike. Tyrifjorden is a landlocked fjord.  It consists of a main body, Storfjorden, along with the Holsfjorden, Nordfjorden, and Steinsfjorden branches.

Branches
Nordfjorden – This is the northernmost fjord arm of Tyrifjorden
Steinsfjorden – This is the northeastern arm of Tyrifjorden
Holsfjorden – This is the southeastern arm as well as being the longest and largest of the fjord branches

Islands
Utøya – camp site for events
Storøya – with a golf club
Frognøya

The name

The Old Norse form of the name was just Tyri (or Tyrvi). This uncompounded name is also the first element in the name Tyristrand. The name is derived from the word tyri meaning "old/dead pine (wood)", referring specifically to the woods of the western side of the lake. The last element -fjorden (the finite form of fjord) is a later addition.

2011 shooting massacre

On 22 July 2011, an island in the lake, Utøya, was the site of a shooting spree during a youth camp held by the Norwegian Labour Party.

References

External links
Moonlight at Tyrifjorden
Frost Mist Over Lake Tyrifjorden

Lakes of Viken (county)
Lier, Norway
Ramsar sites in Norway